NA-4 Swat-IIIis a constituency for the National Assembly of Pakistan from Swat District. The constituency was created in 2018 and it comprises Kabal and Matta tehsils. Kabal and Matta were part of NA-29 (Swat-I) (now NA-3 (Swat-II)) and NA-30 (Swat-II) (now NA-2 (Swat-I)) respectively from 2002 to 2018.

Members of Parliament

2018-2023: NA-4 (Swat-III)

2018 general election 

General elections were held on 25 July 2018.

By-election 2023 
A by-election will be held on 16 March 2023 due to the resignation of Murad Saeed, the previous MNA from this seat.

See also
NA-3 Swat-II
NA-5 Upper Dir

References 

4
4